"Like a Saviour" is a song by English singer-songwriter Ellie Goulding, released on 1 February 2023, through Polydor Records as the fourth single from her fifth studio album, Higher Than Heaven (2023). It was written by Goulding, Tom Mann, Anthony Rossomando and Andrew Wells, and produced by Wells and KOZ.

Background 
"Like a Saviour" is a song by singer-songwriter Ellie Goulding for her upcoming fifth studio album, Higher Than Heaven. It is the album fourth single and second with Goulding as the only main artist credited. She first posted an snippet of the song through teasers on social media apps, like TikTok. About the making of the track, Goulding explained in a post shared on her social media accounts:"We made 'Like A Saviour' as we were coming out of lockdown and it's one I've been waiting for you to all hear. I hope you love it too! Sending warmth, Ellie x"

Critical reception 
The song was met with critical acclaim. In his review for the album Higher Than Heaven for RIFF Magazine, journalist Mike DeWald highlighted the track, stating: "The magnificent track is carried by a percussive groove buoyed by a flute-like sample that gives it a throwback personality. Goulding’s singing and dialed-in arrangement make for one of the best songs on the album."Music critic Roy Lott, for mxdwn Music, described the song as a: "catchy dance tune about her lover picking her spirit up when she has been down on herself."

Music video 
The accompanying music video was directed by Joe Connor. The Independent newspaper described the music video: "In the clip, the singer and a cohort of backing dancers are stranded in a desert and have to fight against the landscape". The choreography was coordinated by Daniel Alwell. The music video was dropped alongside the song on the same day, 1 February 2023.

Live performance 
Goulding performed the track for the first time on 10 December 2022 at the Domain Sydney concert in Australia.

Credits and personnel 
Credits adapted from Spotify.

 Ellie Goulding – songwriting, vocals
 Andrew Wells – songwriting, producer
 Anthony Rossomando – songwriting
 Tom Mann – songwriting
 Koz – producer

Charts

Release history

References 

2023 songs
2023 singles
Ellie Goulding songs
Songs written by Ellie Goulding
Songs written by Anthony Rossomando